Coleophora astragalella is a moth of the family Coleophoridae. It is found south of the line running from France to Ukraine, but it has not been recorded from the Balkan Peninsula. It is also known from central Asia.

Adults are on wing in June and July.

The larvae feed on Astragalus glycyphyllos, Astragalus onobrychis and Astragalus sempervirens. They create an ochreous pistol case of  10–12 mm long, with a pallium that descends up to about half the length of the case. Larvae can be found from autumn to the following May.

References

astragalella
Moths of Europe
Moths of Asia